Island of Lost Women is a 1959 independently made black-and-white castaways melodrama film, produced by George C. Bertholon, Albert J. Cohen, and Alan Ladd, that was directed by Frank Tuttle and released by Warner Bros. Pictures. The film stars Jeff Richards, Venetia Stevenson, John Smith, Alan Napier, Diane Jergens, and June Blair. The film's storyline borrows details from Shakespeare's The Tempest and more contemporaneously the 1956 science fiction film Forbidden Planet.

Plot
Mark Bradley (Richards) is a radio commentator whose pilot, Joe Walker (Smith), is flying him across the South Pacific to a conference in Australia.

Engine trouble develops, and Walker must make a forced landing on the beach of a small, uncharted island inhabited by Dr. Paul Lujan (Napier). On the island with Lujan are his three naive daughters, who have never known another man except their father.

Lujan, unfriendly to the point of hostility, orders the intruders to leave his island, but one of their aircraft's two engines is too badly damaged for them to be able to comply without first making repairs. He grants them a couple days in order to do so. In the meantime he grudgingly introduces Bradley and Walker to his trio of young, beautiful daughters, Venus (Stevenson), Urana (Jergens), and Mercuria (Blair). The two men soon learn that Dr. Lujan was an atomic scientist who fled the civilized world with his family because he fears the havoc being caused by the discovery of nuclear energy.

To the doctor's disapproval, his two older daughters easily fall in love with the two attractive strangers and try to help them, while the third, 16 and jealous of her sisters, tries to foil their plans. This forces them to make a choice between staying on the island with their father or returning with the two men to a civilization they have only experienced via short wave radio broadcasts. When Bradley mentions that he plans on doing a radio broadcast about Lujan and his island location after he returns to civilization, the doctor begins to scheme a way to keep the men and his daughters on the island.

Cast

 Jeff Richards as Mark Bradley
 Venetia Stevenson as Venus
 John Smith as Joe Walker
 Diane Jergens as Urana
 June Blair as Mercuria
 Alan Napier as Dr. Paul Lujan
 Gavin Muir as Dr. McBain
 George Brand as M. Hugh Garland
 Tom Riley as Co-Pilot (uncredited)
 Bob Stratton as Pilot (uncredited)
 Stan Sweet as 2nd Pilot (uncredited)
 Vern Taylor as Co-Pilot (uncredited)

Production
The film was based on an original story by Prescott Chaplin. Film rights were bought by Jaguar Productions, Alan Ladd's production company, which had a film development deal with Warner Bros. Ray Buffum was hired to write the script. Frank Tuttle, who just made Hell on Frisco Bay for Jaguar, was assigned to direct. Jeff Richards was given the lead role and was signed by Jaguar to a five-year contract for two films a year. Warner Bros contract star Venetia Stevenson was cast opposite him. June Blair was borrowed from 20th Century Fox.

References

External links
 
 
 
 

1959 films
1950s English-language films
American black-and-white films
1959 adventure films
Films directed by Frank Tuttle
Films set in Oceania
Films scored by Raoul Kraushaar
American adventure films
1950s American films